Walter Courvoisier (7 February 1875 – 27 December 1931) was a Swiss composer.

Life 
Born in Riehen, Courvoisier was a son of the surgeon Ludwig Georg Courvoisier. He initially studied medicine and worked as a doctor after obtaining his doctorate. In 1902 he went to Munich to study music. He was a student of Selmar Bagge and Ludwig Thuille - whose son-in-law he became - and then taught at the Hochschule für Musik und Theater München, first music theory, and later music composition.

Courvoisier died in Locarno at the age of 76.

Compositions

Operas 
 Lanzelot und Elaine, musical drama in four acts; libretto: Berta Thiersch, pseudonym "Walter Bergh" (1910–12, first performance Munich 1917)
 Die Krähen (The Crows), comedy in one act; libretto: Alois Wohlmuth (1919/20, first performance Munich 1920)
 Der Sünde Zauberei (The Sin of Magic), opera in one prelude and two scenes; libretto: Joseph von Eichendorff after Pedro Calderón de la Barca (1929, unperformed) online

Vocal works 
 The Muse, for baritone and orchestra op. 4; after Heinrich Leuthold (1903)
 Gruppe aus dem Tartarus, ballad for mixed choir and orchestra Op. 5; after Friedrich Schiller (1904)
 Der Dinurstrom, ballad for mixed choir and orchestra op. 11; after Wilhelm Hertz (1906)
 Das Schlachtschiff Téméraire (1796), Ballad for male chorus and orchestra Op. 12; after Detlev von Liliencron (1906)
 Auferstehung (former title: Totenfeier), Cantata for four soloists, mixed choir and orchestra op. 26; after words of the Bible, arranged by Alfred Bertholet (1915)
 Three Choirs a cappella Op. 33; after Joseph von Eichendorff (1931)
 Five Songs for mixed choir a cappella Op. 34 (1931)

Lieder with piano accompaniment 
 Sechs Lieder für tiefe Stimme op. 1 (1903)
 Sieben Lieder op. 2 (1903)
 Acht Gedichte von Anna Ritter op. 3 (1903)
 Sechs Lieder op. 6 (1904)
 Fünf Lieder für tiefe Stimme op. 7 (1904)
 Sieben Gedichte von Peter Cornelius op. 8 (1905)
 Sechs Gedichte von Theodor Storm op. 9 (1905)
 Zwei Gedichte von Theodor Storm, Vier Gedichte von Klaus Groth op. 13 (1906)
 Fünf Gedichte von Wilhelm Hertz op. 14 (1903/04)
 Drei Gedichte von Emanuel Geibel op. 15 (1906)
 Fünf Gedichte von Friedrich Hebbel op. 16 (1907/08)
 Fünf Gedichte von Peter Cornelius op. 17 (1908)
 Zwei Sonette von Michelangelo und altitalienisches Sonett op. 18 (1906/08)
 Sieben Gedichte von Emanuel Geibel op. 19 (1906/08)
 Sieben alte deutsche Gedichte op. 23 (1909/10)
 Gedichte von Hermann Hesse op. 24 (1917, then 1929)
 Geistliche Lieder in fünf Bänden op. 27 (1917–1919)
 Kleine Lieder zu Kinderreimen in four volumes op. 28 (1916–1919)
 Lieder auf alte Deutsche Gedichte op. 29 (1912/14, 1920–1925)

Instrumental works 
Sonatina for piano Op.
 Piano Trio Op. (1902)
 Symphonic Prologue to Carl Spitteler's Olympic Spring for Orchestra Op. 10 (1905)
 Passacaglia and Fugue in B flat minor for piano op. 20 (1908/09)
 Variations and Fugue on a separate theme in E flat major for piano Op. 21 (1909)
 Variations on an own theme D major for piano Op. 22 (1909)
 Festival Overture for Orchestra (1920s)
 Six Suites for violin solo Op. 31 (1921/22)
 Slow movement for string quartet Op. (1921/22)

Students 
 Dora Pejačević (1885–1923), composer
 Max Butting (1888–1976), composer
 Gerhart von Westerman (1894–1963), composer
 Robert Gerhard (1896–1970), composer
 Paul Ben-Haim (1897–1984), composer, conductor
 Albert Moeschinger (1897–1985)
 Walter Simon Huber (1898–1978), music teacher, organist and choir director 
 Willy Burkhard (1900–1955), composer
 Hermann Reutter (1900–1985), composer, pianist
 Franz Rupp (1901–1992), pianist and accompanist
 Hans Haug (1900–1967), composer, conductor, pianist
 Heinrich Sutermeister (1910–1995), composer

Further reading 
 Theodor Kroyer: Walter Courvoisier, Munich 1929.

External links 
 
 
 Walter Courvoisier on BMLO
 Walter Courvoisier on UBNL
 Nachlass Walter Courvoisiers in der Archivdatenbank of the Schweizerische Nationalbibliothek
 Hörbeispiele: Lied der Spinnerin op. 19,1 and extracts from Variationen und Fuge op. 21

References 

20th-century classical composers
Swiss opera composers
Swiss music educators
Swiss conductors (music)
Academic staff of the University of Music and Performing Arts Munich
1875 births
1931 deaths
People from Riehen
20th-century Swiss composers